The Kamnik–Savinja Alps are a mountain range of the Southern Limestone Alps. They lie in northern Slovenia, except for the northernmost part, which lies in Austria.

The western part of the range was named the Kamnik Alps in 1778 by the scientists Belsazar Hacquet and Franz Xaver von Wulfen, after the town of Kamnik (Stein) in the valley of the Kamnik Bistrica River. Its eastern part was named the Savinja Alps (Sanntaler Alpen) or Solčava Alps (Sulzbacher  Alpen) by the mountaineer Johannes von Frischauf in 1875, after the settlement of Solčava (Sulzbach) and the main river, the upper Savinja (Sann).

Geography
The Kamnik–Savinja Alps are located south of the Karawanks range at the border of Austria and Slovenia, stretching from the Sava River in the west to the Savinja in the east, where the adjacent Slovenian Prealps with the Pohorje range, the Celje Hills at the Dravinja River, as well as the Sava Hills are located. In the northwest, the valley of Vellach Creek (at ) leading to Bad Vellach is the southernmost point of both the Austrian state of Carinthia and Austria as a whole.

The entire main chain is today part of Slovenia. Historically it formed the border between the Inner Austrian duchies of Carinthia, Styria, and Carniola. The tripoint was located at the Carinthia Mount Rinka.

There is also a small glacier below Mount Skuta, which is the easternmost glacier in the Southern Alps.

Mountains and passes
The most important peaks are:
 Grintovec – 
 Kočna – 
 Skuta – 
 Ojstrica – 
 Storžič – 
 Planjava – 
 Brana – 
 Carinthia Mount Rinka – 
 Cold Mountain – 
 Krofička – 
 Kalce Ridge – 

In total, 28 peaks surpass 2,000 m. The total area of the Slovene part is about 900 km2. About three-quarters of the area is covered with forest, and many of the higher peaks are bleak and rocky.

The most important passes are the Seebergsattel between Austrian Carinthia and Slovenia's Municipality of Jezersko, as well as the Pavlič Pass. On the Slovenian side, there is a skiing area, whereas tourism in the Vellach Valley focuses on health spas.

Gallery

See also 
List of mountains in Austria
List of mountains in Slovenia

External links

Kamnik–Savinja Alps on Hiking Trail

 
Southern Limestone Alps
Mountain ranges of the Alps
Mountain ranges of Carinthia (state)
Mountain ranges of Slovenia
Natura 2000 in Slovenia